Class T 5 of the Palatinate Railway was a German, goods train, tank locomotive class with five coupled axles and no carrying axles.  

In 1925 they were absorbed by the Deutsche Reichsbahn as DRG Class 94.0 into their renumbering plan.

These engines were bought specifically for the inclines between Pirmasens and Biebermühle. They could reach a speed of  40 km/h on the level with a 1,510 tonne train load, and 30 km/h on an incline of 2%. Overall, however, they were unable to match the power of locomotives from Prussia or Saxony and were retired by 1926.

The locomotive which was formerly no. 307 in the Palatinate Railway (DRG No. 94 002) was disposed of to the Eschweiler Mining Union and employed at the  Baesweiler coal mine, where it was given the name of Carl Alexander and the number 3; it remained in service there until 1974. Today it is displayed at the Neustadt/Weinstrasse Railway Museum in Neustadt an der Weinstrasse, Rhineland-Palatinate, Germany.

See also 
 Royal Bavarian State Railways 
 Palatinate Railway 
 List of Bavarian locomotives and railbuses
 List of Palatine locomotives and railbuses

References 

 
 

0-10-0T locomotives
T 5
Railway locomotives introduced in 1907
Krauss locomotives
Standard gauge locomotives of Germany
E n2t locomotives
Freight locomotives